Wasserstrom is an Ashkenazi Jewish surname composed out of the German words Wasser for "water" and Strom meaning "stream". Notable people with the surname include:
 James Wasserstrom, American diplomat
 Jeffrey Wasserstrom, American historian of modern China

See also
 Wasserstrom Company

References

German-language surnames
Jewish surnames
Yiddish-language surnames